Donald H. Meichenbaum (born June 10, 1940) is an American psychologist and Distinguished Professor Emeritus of Psychology at the University of Waterloo, Ontario. He is a research director of the Melissa Institute for Violence Prevention and Treatment at the University of Miami. Meichenbaum is known for his research and publications on psychotherapy, and contributed to the development of the technique of cognitive-behavioural therapy (CBT). In 1982, a survey of 800 members of the American Psychological Association voted Meichenbaum the tenth most influential psychotherapist of the 20th century. At the time of his retirement from the University of Waterloo in 1998, Meichenbaum was the most-cited psychology researcher at a Canadian university.

Education 
Meichenbaum was educated at William Howard Taft High School in New York City. He then entered the City College of New York in 1958 with the intention of becoming an engineer, before changing course and graduating in 1962 as a psychology major. He was accepted on to the graduate psychology program at University of Illinois Urbana-Champaign. He wrote his dissertation titled How to Train Schizophrenics to Talk to Themselves, having shown an interest in the topic of self-talk since childhood. He graduated with an MA and PhD in clinical psychology with minors in the subjects of developmental psychology and physiology in 1966, working as a research assistant at a Veterans Health Administration hospital in Danville, Illinois alongside his studies.

Career 
Meichenbaum became assistant professor of psychology at the University of Waterloo in 1966. During his tenure at Waterloo he began a research program exploring the role of cognitive and emotional factors in the behaviour change process. Several papers and books authored by Meichenbaum during his tenure at Waterloo focused on the use of self-instruction to effect behaviour change, which became a core principle of cognitive-behavioural therapy. Meichenbaum applied this concept to numerous areas of psychotherapy, including post-traumatic stress disorder, impulsivity in school children, test anxiety in college students, and adults with chronic pain, anger, and substance abuse issues. In 1977, Meichenbaum co-founded and served as the associate editor of the journal Cognitive Therapy and Research. Meichenbaum's 1985 clinical handbook Stress Inoculation Training is used by the United States Department of Veterans Affairs as one treatment for PTSD in veterans. He received the Canadian Psychological Association Award for Distinguished Contribution to Psychology as a Profession in 1990, receiving their Lifetime Achievement Award in 1997.

Following his retirement from the University of Waterloo in 1998, Meichenbaum joined the Melissa Institute for Violence Prevention and Treatment of Victims as research director, which is based at the University of Miami's School of Education and Development, where Meichenbaum also worked as distinguished visiting professor. In 2012, Meichenbaum published Roadmap to Resilience: A Guide for Military, Trauma Victims and Their Families, a handbook to help service members reintegrate into civilian life and for clinicians translating evidence-based interventions into clinical guidelines for patients.  Meichenbaum has been a frequent critic of the proliferation of non-evidence-based techniques in the field of psychotherapy; his 2018 article How to Spot Hype in the Field of Psychotherapy, co-authored with Scott Lilienfeld, was chosen as the "most valuable contribution to the general field of psychotherapy" of that year by the Journal of Contemporary Psychotherapy which reviewed articles across 81 journals.

Role in developing cognitive-behavioural therapy 
While the cognitive revolution in psychology took place in the 1960s, the combination of cognitive and behavioural approaches in clinical psychology did not gain traction until the mid-1970s. Building on Albert Ellis' technique of rational emotive behaviour therapy (REBT) and Aaron T. Beck's technique of cognitive therapy, Meichenbaum developed the therapeutic technique of cognitive-behaviour modification, publishing the 1977 clinical handbook Cognitive Behaviour Modification: An Integrative Approach. Cognitive-behaviour modification is an umbrella term which describes treatments that aim to change overt behaviours by changing thought patterns and cognitive processes. Cognitive-behaviour modification and CBT have been described as "nearly identical in their assumptions and treatment methods", the difference being cognitive-behaviour modification seeks overt behaviour change as a therapeutic outcome while CBT aims to change cognitions in the assumption that behaviour change will follow. In the same 1982 survey that voted Meichenbaum the tenth most influential psychotherapist of the 20th century, Cognitive-Behaviour Modification was voted "the 4th most representative book of the current zeitgeist in counselling and psychotherapy". Meichenbaum developed the techniques of self-instructional training (SIT) and stress inoculation training, which are described as two of the six major cognitive-behavioural therapies in the Handbook of Cognitive-Behavioral Therapies (4th ed.) (Dobson, 2019). While Ellis and Beck are often cited as the two founders of the basic clinical model of cognitive-behavioural therapy approaches, the model proposed by Meichenbaum was found to occupy the cognitive-behavioural realm with authoritativeness equal to those proposed by Ellis' REBT and Beck's cognitive therapy during the 1970s (alongside models proposed by Arnold Lazarus and Michael J. Mahoney).

Publications

Books 

 Cognitive Behaviour Modification: An Integrative Approach (1977)
 Coping with Stress (1983)
 Stress Reduction and Prevention (1983)
 Pain and Behavioral Medicine: A Cognitive-Behavioral Perspective (1983)
 Stress Inoculation Training (1985)
 Facilitating Treatment Adherence. A Practitioner's Guidebook (1987)
A Clinical Handbook/Practical Therapist Manual for Assessing and Treating Adults with Post-Traumatic Stress Disorder (PTSD)  (1994)
 Nurturing Independent Learners: Helping Students Take Charge of Their Learning (1998)
 Treatment of Individuals with Anger-Control Problems and Aggressive Behaviors: a Clinical Handbook (2001)
 Roadmap to Resilience: A Guide for Military, Trauma Victims and Their Families (2012)
 The Evolution of Cognitive Behaviour Therapy: A Personal and Professional Journey with Don Meichenbaum (2017)
 Treating Individuals with Addictive Disorders: A Strengths-Based Workbook for Patients and Clinicians (2020)

Articles 
Meichenbaum has published extensively in academic journals and conferences. A comprehensive archive of these publications is maintained at the Melissa Institute website.

 "Training impulsive children to talk to themselves: a means of developing self-control", Journal of Abnormal Psychology (1971)
 "Examination of model characteristics in reducing avoidance behavior", Journal of Personality and Social Psychology (1971)
 "Cognitive modification of test anxious college students", Journal of Consulting and Clinical Psychology (1972)
 "Training schizophrenics to talk to themselves: A means of developing attentional controls", Behavior Therapy (1973)
 "Cognitive behavior modification", Scandinavian Journal of Behaviour Therapy (1977)
"35 Years of Working With Suicidal Patients: Lessons Learned", Canadian Psychology (2005)
"Ways to improve political decision-making: Negotiating errors to be avoided", Psychological and Political Strategies for Peace (2011)

References 

American cognitive psychologists
Psychotherapists
University of Illinois Urbana-Champaign alumni
American expatriate academics
Academic staff of the University of Waterloo
American expatriates in Canada
Scientists from New York City
1940 births
Living people